Maryland began as a proprietary colony of the Catholic Calvert family, the Lords Baltimore under a royal charter, and its first eight governors were appointed by them. When the Catholic King of England, James II, was overthrown in the Glorious Revolution, the Calverts lost their charter and Maryland became a royal colony. It was governed briefly by local Protestants before the arrival of the first of 12 governors appointed directly by the English crown. The royal charter was restored to the Calverts in 1715 and governors were again appointed by the Calverts through the American Revolution.

Colonial period
This list only includes legally appointed governors, and excludes those who, during brief periods of rebellion, claimed themselves as governors of the colony.

See also
List of governors of Maryland

Notes

Maryland